"B-2LM" is a Soviet 130 mm two-gun naval artillery turret, based on the "B-13" ("Б-13") gun. Production started in 1939. "B-2LM" was established on several Soviet ships, including the destroyer leader Tashkent. However, it had a relatively low rate of fire and had a maximum elevation of 45 degrees making it incapable of anti-aircraft fire.

General characteristics
 Maximum laying speed: vertical - 9.85 degrees per second, horizontal - 9.7 degrees per second
 Shell weight: 33.5 kg (74 lbs)
 Initial velocity of the shell: 870 m/s
 Range: 25,597 m

References
 The B-13 gun on NavWeaps.com

Naval guns of the Soviet Union
130 mm artillery
Leningradsky Metallichesky Zavod products